The Ohio Renaissance Festival is an annual event that takes place on weekends from late August through October. This Renaissance festival is held at a permanent site located near Harveysburg in Warren County, Ohio. It was voted Best Festival in Warren County in 2011.

The Ohio Renaissance Festival by Peter Carroll, and was bought in 2015 by Brimstone and Fire LLC. It has grown into a  permanent village with over 100 shops and 12 outdoor stages. 
The festival is set in the fictional 16th-century English village of "Willy Nilly-on-the-Wash," during the reign of Elizabeth I. Historical figures like Sir Walter Raleigh, Sir Francis Drake, Sir John Hawkins and John Dee are depicted in the village, along with fictional characters.

The festival features costumed performers on stages and in the streets, jousting, craft shops selling and demonstrating period themed handcrafted goods and artwork, renaissance themed food, and regularly scheduled comedy, music, and acrobatic shows. Featured shows include Theatre in the Ground, DaVinci Bros. Comedy Opera, Dirk and Guido: The Swordsmen! and the Kamikaze Fireflies (the duo that were featured on America's Got Talent). Each weekend of the event has a different theme, including Fantasy Weekend and Trick-Or-Treat Weekend.

See also 
 Renaissance fair
 List of Renaissance fairs
 Reenactment
 Jousting
 Society for Creative Anachronism
 List of open air and living history museums in the United States

References

External links
Ohio Renaissance Festival
Discover Ohio

Festivals in Ohio
Tourist attractions in Warren County, Ohio
Renaissance fairs
1990 establishments in Ohio
Recurring events established in 1990